This article is about the particular significance of the year 1815 to Wales and its people.

Incumbents
Lord Lieutenant of Anglesey – Henry Paget, 1st Marquess of Anglesey 
Lord Lieutenant of Brecknockshire and Monmouthshire – Henry Somerset, 6th Duke of Beaufort
Lord Lieutenant of Caernarvonshire – Thomas Bulkeley, 7th Viscount Bulkeley
Lord Lieutenant of Cardiganshire – Thomas Johnes
Lord Lieutenant of Carmarthenshire – George Rice, 3rd Baron Dynevor 
Lord Lieutenant of Denbighshire – Sir Watkin Williams-Wynn, 5th Baronet    
Lord Lieutenant of Flintshire – Robert Grosvenor, 1st Marquess of Westminster 
Lord Lieutenant of Glamorgan – John Crichton-Stuart, 2nd Marquess of Bute (from 2 June) 
Lord Lieutenant of Merionethshire – Sir Watkin Williams-Wynn, 5th Baronet
Lord Lieutenant of Montgomeryshire – Edward Clive, 1st Earl of Powis
Lord Lieutenant of Pembrokeshire – Richard Philipps, 1st Baron Milford
Lord Lieutenant of Radnorshire – George Rodney, 3rd Baron Rodney

Bishop of Bangor – Henry Majendie 
Bishop of Llandaff – Richard Watson
Bishop of St Asaph – William Cleaver (until 15 May);  John Luxmoore (from 8 June) 
Bishop of St Davids – Thomas Burgess

Events
23 January - John Scandrett Harford inherits the family estates on the death of his father.
28 March - Opening of the British School for boys at Newport.
12 April - Admiral Thomas Foley is knighted.
23 May - John Luxmoore replaces William Cleaver as Bishop of St Asaph.
May or June - Bryn Oer Tramway opens in South Wales.
18 June - Henry Paget, 1st Marquess of Anglesey, famously loses a leg at the Battle of Waterloo.  General Thomas Picton is killed in the same battle.
A twice-weekly boat service between Cardiff and Bristol is established.

Arts and literature

New books

English language
Walter Davies - General View of the Agriculture and Domestic Economy of South Wales
Richard Fenton - Memoirs of an Old Wig
Thomas Love Peacock - Headlong Hall (anonymous; dated 1816)

Welsh language
David Richards (Dafydd Ionawr) - Barddoniaeth Gristianogawl

Music
Peter Roberts - The Cambrian Popular Antiquities of Wales

Births
24 January - Thomas Gee, publisher (died 1898)
16 April - Henry Austin Bruce, 1st Baron Aberdare (died 1895)
May - William Lucas Collins, author (died 1887)
2 June - John Deffett Francis, painter and art collector (died 1901)
21 November - John Bowen, Bishop of Sierra Leone (died 1859)
13 December - Thomas Rees, Congregational minister (died 1885)
date unknown
Thomas Gruffydd, harpist (died 1887)
Richard Kyrke Penson, architect (died 1886)

Deaths
5 March - Sir Stephen Glynne, 8th Baronet, 34
24 April - John Lloyd, naturalist and politician, 65
15 May - William Cleaver, Bishop of St Asaph, 72/73
18 June - Thomas Picton, soldier, 56 (killed at the Battle of Waterloo)
August - Robert Williams, farmer and poet, 70/71
date unknown - Edward Edwards, Royal Navy officer of Welsh parentage, 73

References

 
 Wales